Madan Dam, is an earthfill dam on Waghadinalla river near Arvi, Wardha district in the state of Maharashtra in India.

Specifications

Purpose
 Irrigation

See also
 Dams in Maharashtra
 List of reservoirs and dams in India

References

Dams in Wardha district
Dams completed in 2003
2003 establishments in Maharashtra